Five Spanish Songs is a Spanish language EP by Canadian indie rock band Destroyer. It was released on November 26, 2013 via Merge Records and on December 2, 2013 via Dead Oceans in Europe.

The album was streamed via Hype Machine on November 22, 2013.

Background
The EP consists of five songs entirely sung in Spanish. The songs were originally written by Spanish musician Antonio Luque and performed by his band, Sr. Chinarro. The EP also features contributions from fellow musicians Nicolas Bragg, Stephen Hamm, Josh Wells, along with John Collins and David Carswell, who also produced the record.

On his decision to record the EP in Spanish, the frontman Dan Bejar stated:

Also in an interview with The Quietus, Bejar expanded his opinions about the EP:

Critical reception

Stuart Berman of Pitchfork gave the EP a positive review. While he saw the album as an "opportunity for Bejar to celebrate his own Spanish heritage," he also stated: "To that end, even if your familiarity with Spanish doesn’t extend beyond reading the menu at your local taco joint, the experience of listening to Five Spanish Songs is really no different than that of any other Destroyer record."

Michael Edwards of Exclaim! wrote: "Five Spanish Songs is satisfying enough for its 20-minute runtime, but it definitely lacks the heft of his recent work; without his distinctive lyrics, it doesn't really feel like proper Destroyer." A similar point of view was also shared by Chris Buckle of The Skinny, who stated: "With Dan Bejar’s piquant way with words a substantial part of Destroyer’s appeal, Five Spanish Songs may herald disappointment for those who don’t share the Canadian’s bilingual abilities."

Track listing

Charts

Personnel
John Collins - piano, synthesizer, drums, percussion
Daniel Bejar - vocals, acoustic guitar, piano, synthesizer
David Carswell - acoustic guitar, electric guitar, drums, percussion, production
Nicolas Bragg - electric guitar

References

External links

Spanish-language EPs
2013 EPs
Destroyer (band) EPs
Merge Records EPs
Dead Oceans albums
Albums produced by John Collins (Canadian musician)
Albums produced by David Carswell